Soldiers’ and Sailors’ Monument (1887) is a monument in Arlington, MA, dedicated to the  men of  who served in the Civil War. The victory column in Arlington is located at the junction of Massachusetts Avenue and Broadway. 42 feet tall, it is made from three different types of granite from Barre, Vermont; Quincy, Massachusetts; and Westerly, Rhode Island. It was constructed by the Mitchell Granite Company of Quincy (which built many a stone Civil War memorial in Massachusetts) and dedicated on June 17, 1887.

The primary inscription reads, “In grateful remembrance of the Soldiers of Arlington who gave their lives to their country in the war for the defense of the Union 1861-1865.” Thirty three people are listed along with their place of death. 

Another panel inscription quotes Abraham Lincoln, "THAT THE GOVERNMENT OF THE PEOPLE BY THE PEOPLE AND FOR THE PEOPLE SHALL NOT PERISH FROM THE EARTH"

A third panel reads Manassas to  Appomattox.

The memorial by architects Van Brunt and Howe contains elements of Beaux Artes and Richardson Romanesque styles. The eagle finial rests astride a dome decorated with wreaths. An inscription reading " LIBERTY AND UNION- ONE AND INSEPARABLE-  NOW AND FOREVER" circumscribes the marble  frieze below the dome. Four low relief columns decorate the supporting pillar with names of war dead decorating intervening pink granite panels. Four lion faces are beneath the pillars with the entire mass resting on a circular base of granite blocks.

References 

Sculptures in Massachusetts 
1887 sculptures
Monuments and memorials in Massachusetts
Granite sculptures
Buildings and structures in Arlington, Massachusetts